Dovis Bičkauskis (born 5 September 1993 in Šiauliai, Lithuania) is a Lithuanian professional basketball player who plays for CBet Jonava of the Lithuanian Basketball League.

Career 

Bičkauskis spent many years in the National Basketball League (NKL), playing for BC Statyba, KK Radviliškis – Juodeliai, Perlas-MRU, BC Trakai, before joining Sūduva-Mantinga, with whom he won the championship in 2016. After the season, he signed with Lithuanian Basketball League (LKL) team Juventus Utena, where over the next three seasons, he quickly became one of the top point guards in the league. In 2019, he led the LKL in assists.

On July 3, 2019, Bičkauskis signed a 2-years deal with Rytas Vilnius, the runners-up in the LKL.

National team career 

Bičkauskis won gold medal with the Lithuanian team during the 2017 Summer Universiade after defeating the United States' team 74–85 in the final. He was also invited to the Lithuania men's national basketball team to play in the FIBA Basketball World Cup qualification in 2019.

References

1993 births
Living people
BC Juventus players
BC Statyba players
Lithuanian men's basketball players
Point guards
Universiade gold medalists for Lithuania
Universiade medalists in basketball
Medalists at the 2017 Summer Universiade